The 2022 CONCACAF Women's U-17 Championship was the 7th edition of the CONCACAF Women's U-17 Championship, the biennial international youth football championship organised by CONCACAF for the women's under-17 national teams of the North, Central American and Caribbean region.

The top three teams of the tournament qualified for the 2022 FIFA U-17 Women's World Cup in India as the CONCACAF representatives.

Qualification

The 41 CONCACAF teams were ranked based on the CONCACAF Women's Under-17 Ranking as of 1 July 2019, and 26 entered the competition for the 2022 CONCACAF Women's U-17 Championship final tournament. The highest-ranked 16 entrants advanced directly to the group stage of the final tournament, while the other 10 entrants participated in qualifying.

Venues

Draw
The draw of the tournament was held on 18 November 2021, 11:00 AST (UTC−4), at the CONCACAF Headquarters in Miami, Florida. The 16 teams which entered the group stage were drawn into four groups of four teams. Based on the CONCACAF Women's Under-17 Ranking, the 16 teams were distributed into four pots, with teams in Pot 1 assigned to each group prior to the draw, as follows:

Squads

Players born on or after 1 January 2005 are eligible to compete. Each team must register a squad of 20 players, two of whom must be goalkeepers.
2022 U17 W Squads-Official

Match officials

Group stage
The top three teams in each group advanced to the round of 16, where they were joined by the four teams advancing from the 2022 CONCACAF Women's U-17 Championship qualification.

Tiebreakers
The ranking of teams in each group is determined as follows (Regulations Article 12.8):
Points obtained in all group matches (three points for a win, one for a draw, zero for a loss).
Goal difference in all group matches.
Number of goals scored in all group matches.
Points obtained in the matches played between the teams in question.
Goal difference in the matches played between the teams in question.
Number of goals scored in the matches played between the teams in question.
Fair play points in all group matches (only one deduction can be applied to a player in a single match):
Yellow card: −1 point
Indirect red card (second yellow card): −3 points
Direct red card: −4 points
Yellow card and direct red card: −5 points
Drawing of lots.

All times are local, AST (UTC−4).

Group E

Group F

Group G

Group H

Knockout stage
In the knockout stage, if a match is level at the end of 90 minutes, extra time is played, and if still tied after extra time, the match is decided by a penalty shoot-out (Regulations Article 12.13).

Qualified teams

Bracket

Round of 16

Quarter-finals

Semi-finals
Winners qualify for the 2022 FIFA U-17 Women's World Cup.

Third place
Winner qualifies for 2022 FIFA U-17 Women's World Cup.

Final

Winners

Goalscorers

Qualified teams for FIFA U-17 Women's World Cup

1 Bold indicates champions for that year. Italic indicates hosts for that year.

Awards
Source:

References

External links
Concacaf Women's Under-17 Championship, CONCACAF.com

2022
2022 in youth association football
Concacaf
International association football competitions hosted by the Dominican Republic
CONCACAF
CONCACAF